Veer Bala Rastogi is a writer of textbooks on biology in India. She received her master's degree in Zoology with the distinction of standing 1st in the order of merit, and was awarded the Gold Medal. She did her Ph.D. from Meerut University under the guidance of eminent zoologist, the late Dr. M.L. Bhatia, Professor of Zoology, University of Delhi.

Rastogi had been a member of the "Academy of Zoology", and was a member of The "Textbook evolution Committee", NCERT, New Delhi. She was a member of the academic staff of Zoology at Meerut College, Meerut(Uttar Pradesh) from 1961 to 1967. She has been writing books for over five decades. She has authored biology books for ISC, CBSE aspirants as well as for several state boards. Her books on Cytology, Genetics, Ecology and evolutionary Biology are very popular at University level all over India. She was awarded The Distinguished Author of the year Award in 2012 conferred by the Federation of Educational Publishers in Delhi, India for her brilliant work. Fundamentals of Molecular Biology is an important work by Rastogi. Recently, her textbook for 11th grade got selected for Bhutan's national textbook.

References 

Living people
20th-century Indian zoologists
Women zoologists
Indian women biologists
Scientists from Uttar Pradesh
Women scientists from Uttar Pradesh
Year of birth missing (living people)
Chaudhary Charan Singh University alumni
20th-century Indian women